The women's team tournament of the 2012 World Team Table Tennis Championships was held from March 25 to April 1, 2012. at Dortmund, Germany. The draw was held on February 22.

China won the final, beating Singapore 3–0.

Medalists

Championship division

Players list

Preliminary round

Group A

Group B

Group C

Group D

Knockout stage

Place 1–12

First round

Quarterfinals

Semifinals

Final

Place 13–24 bracket

Second division

Preliminary round

Group E

Group F

Group G

Group H

Knockout stage

Place 25–36 bracket

Place 37–48 bracket

Third division

Preliminary round

Group I

Group J

Group K

Group L

Knockout stage

Place 49–60 bracket

Place 61–72 bracket

Fourth division

Preliminary round

Group M

Group N

Group O

Group P

Knockout stage

Place 73–84 bracket

Place 85–92 bracket

References

External links
ITTF.com

Women's team